Super Show 4 was the first live world concert tour and fourth international tour by South Korean boy band Super Junior, in support of their fifth studio album, Mr. Simple. The world tour commenced with two shows in Seoul in November 2011 and continued onto Japan, Taiwan, China, other Asian countries, and France.

On June 28, 2013, a live album, Super Show 4 Concert Album, of the concert held in Seoul was released. On August 8, 2013, a 3D film of the Seoul concert was released in 30 theaters across South Korea. The 3D concert movie play out Super Junior’s Super Show 4 concert, part of its world tour that was held in May 2012 at the Olympic Park Gymnastics Stadium.

Concerts
The two concerts in Osaka were played to a total audience of 80,000 people. In February, the group set records for the fastest selling concert in Taiwan and also the first overseas artist to hold four consecutive concerts at the Taipei Arena. In March, the group became the first Korean singers to hold two consecutive concerts in Macau, and broke the record for the biggest concert audience in Thailand, with 40,000 people. The French and Indonesian legs of the tour also marks the group's first solo concert in Paris, and Jakarta.

On March 29, 2012, Sydney based promoter JK Entertainment announced that Super Show 4 will be held on May 5 at the Allphones Arena. However its cancellation by the promoter was announced on April 16, due to the hospitalisation of the concert director requiring immediate medical treatment.

On April 23, 2012, SM Entertainment announced the addition of two encore concerts in Seoul on May 26 and 27. Tickets went on sale on April 26 along with special concert packages for overseas fans offered by SM Town Travel. The encore shows were played to an audience of 22,000 for three and a half hours.

For the second leg of the Japanese dates, 400,000 fans tried to buy tickets for the May 12 concert, as soon as they went on sale resulting in the addition of the May 13 concert. The two concerts were played to a total audience of 110,000 people.

Setlist

Tour dates

Personnel
 Tour organizer: SM Entertainment
 Tour promoter: Dream Maker Entercom
 Tour guest performers : EXO-M, f(x), The Grace

Live album

Super Show 4 - Super Junior World Tour Concert Album is Super Junior's fourth live recorded album, released on June 28, 2013. This album contains three CDs with 40 live recordings from the Super Show 4 concerts. It sold about 18,000 copies in South Korea.

Track listing

References

External links
 Dream Maker Entercom 
 Super Junior official homepage 
 Super Junior official Avex Taiwan homepage 
 Super Junior official Japanese homepage 

2011 concert tours
2012 concert tours
Super Junior concert tours